Blue Ocean Strategy is a book published in 2004 written by W. Chan Kim and Renée Mauborgne, professors at INSEAD, and the name of the marketing theory detailed on the book.

They assert that these strategic moves create a leap in value for the company, its buyers, and its employees while unlocking new demand and making the competition irrelevant. The book presents analytical frameworks and tools to foster an organization's ability to systematically create and capture "blue oceans"—unexplored new market areas. An expanded edition of  the book was published in 2015, while a sequel entitled Blue Ocean Shift was published in 2017.

Book layout and concepts 
The book is divided into three parts:

 The first part presents key concepts of blue ocean strategy, including Value Innovation – the simultaneous pursuit of differentiation and low cost – and key analytical tools and frameworks such as the strategy canvas and the four actions framework. The four actions framework aids in eliminating the trade-off between differentiation and low cost within a company. The four actions framework consists of the following:
 Raise: This questions which factors must be raised within an industry in terms of product, pricing or service standards.
 Eliminate: This questions which areas of a company or industry could be completely eliminated to reduce costs and to create an entirely new market. 
 Reduce: This questions which areas of a company’s product or service are not entirely necessary but play a significant role in your industry, for example, the cost of manufacturing a certain material for a product could be reduced. Therefore, it can be reduced without completely eliminating it. 
 Create: This prompts companies to be innovative with their products. By creating an entirely new product or service, a company can create their own market through differentiation from the competition.
 The second part describes the four principles of blue ocean strategy formulation. These four formulation principles address how an organization can create blue oceans by looking across the six conventional boundaries of competition (Six Paths Framework), reduce their planning risk by following the four steps of visualizing strategy, create new demand by unlocking the three tiers of noncustomers and launch a commercially viable blue ocean idea by aligning unprecedented utility of an offering with strategic pricing and target costing and by overcoming adoption hurdles. The book uses many examples across industries to demonstrate how to break out of traditional competitive (structuralist) strategic thinking and to grow demand and profits for the company and the industry by using blue ocean (reconstructionist) strategic thinking. The four principles are:
 how to create uncontested market space by reconstructing market boundaries,
 focusing on the big picture,
 reaching beyond existing demand and supply in new market spaces 
 getting the strategic sequence right.
 The third and final part describes the two key implementation principles of blue ocean strategy including tipping point leadership and fair process. These implementation principles are essential for leaders to overcome the four key organizational hurdles that can prevent even the best strategies from being executed. The four key hurdles comprise the cognitive, resource, motivational and political hurdles that prevent people involved in strategy execution from understanding the need to break from status quo, finding the resources to implement the new strategic shift, keeping your people committed to implementing the new strategy, and from overcoming the powerful vested interests that may block the change.

Proposition
In the book the authors draw the attention of their readers towards the correlation of success stories across industries and the formulation of strategies that provide a solid base to create unconventional success – a strategy termed as "blue ocean strategy". Unlike the "red ocean strategy", the conventional approach to business of beating competition derived from the military organization, the "blue ocean strategy" tries to align innovation with utility, price and cost positions. The book mocks the phenomena of conventional choice between product/service differentiation and lower cost, but rather suggests that both differentiation and lower costs are achievable simultaneously.

The authors ask readers "What is the best unit of analysis of profitable growth? Company? Industry?" – a fundamental question without which any strategy for profitable growth is not worthwhile. The authors justify with original and practical ideas that neither the company nor the industry is the best unit of analysis of profitable growth; rather it is the strategic move that creates "blue ocean" and sustained high performance. The book examines the experience of companies in areas as diverse as watches, wine, cement, computers, automobiles, textiles, coffee makers, airlines, retailers, and even the circus, to answer this fundamental question and builds upon the argument about "value innovation" being the cornerstone of a blue ocean strategy. Value innovation is necessarily the alignment of innovation with utility, price and cost positions. This creates uncontested market space and makes competition irrelevant. The new chapters in the expanded edition of the book deal with the issues of how to develop and align the three strategy propositions of value, profit and people, how to sustain and renew blue ocean strategy at both the business level and the corporate level, and how to avoid red ocean traps that keep organizations anchored in existing market space even as they attempt to create new market space. The following section discusses the concept behind the book in detail.

Concept 

The metaphor of red and blue oceans describes the market universe.

Red oceans represent all the industries in existence today – the known market space. In the red oceans, industry boundaries are defined and accepted, and the competitive rules of the game are known. Here companies try to outperform their rivals to grab a greater share of product or service demand. As the market space gets crowded, prospects for profits and growth are reduced. Products become commodities or niche, and cutthroat competition turns the ocean bloody; hence, the term "red oceans".

Blue oceans, in contrast, denote all the industries not in existence today – the unknown market space, untainted by competition. In blue oceans, demand is created rather than fought over. There is ample opportunity for growth that is both profitable and rapid. In blue oceans, competition is irrelevant because the rules of the game are waiting to be set. Blue ocean is an analogy to describe the wider, deeper potential of market space that is not yet explored.

The cornerstone of blue ocean strategy is "value innovation", a concept originally outlined in Kim & Mauborgne's 1997 article "Value Innovation - The Strategic Logic of High Growth". Value innovation is the simultaneous pursuit of differentiation and low cost, creating value for both the buyer, the company, and its employees, thereby opening up new and uncontested market space. The aim of value innovation, as articulated in the article, is not to compete, but to make the competition irrelevant by changing the playing field of strategy. The strategic move must raise and create value for the market, while simultaneously reducing or eliminating features or services that are less valued by the current or future market. The Four Actions Framework is used to help create value innovation and break the value-cost trade-off.  Value innovation challenges Michael Porter's idea that successful businesses are either low-cost providers or niche-players.  Instead, blue ocean strategy proposes finding value that crosses conventional market segmentation and offering value and lower cost. Educator Charles W. L. Hill proposed a similar idea in 1988 and claimed that Porter's model was flawed because differentiation can be a means for firms to achieve low cost. He proposed that a combination of differentiation and low cost might be necessary for firms to achieve a sustainable competitive advantage.

Many others have proposed similar strategies. For example, Swedish educators Jonas Ridderstråle and Kjell Nordström in their 1999 book Funky Business follow a similar line of reasoning. For example, "competing factors" in blue ocean strategy are similar to the definition of "finite and infinite dimensions" in Funky Business. Just as blue ocean strategy claims that a red ocean strategy does not guarantee success, Funky Business explained that "Competitive Strategy is the route to nowhere". Funky Business argues that firms need to create "sensational strategies". Just like blue ocean strategy, a sensational strategy is about "playing a different game" according to Ridderstråle and Nordström. Ridderstråle and Nordström also claim that the aim of companies is to create temporary monopolies. Kim and Mauborgne explain that the aim of companies is to create blue oceans, that will eventually turn red. This is the same idea expressed in the form of an analogy. Ridderstråle and Nordström also claimed in 1999 that "in the slow-growth 1990s overcapacity is the norm in most businesses". Kim and Mauborgne claim that blue ocean strategy makes sense in a world where supply exceeds demand.

Blue ocean vs. red ocean 
Kim and Mauborgne argue that while traditional competition-based strategies (red ocean strategies) are necessary, they are not sufficient to sustain high performance. Companies need to go beyond competing. To seize new profit and growth opportunities they also need to create blue oceans. The authors argue that competition based strategies assume that an industry's structural conditions are given and that firms are forced to compete within them, an assumption based on what academics call the structuralist view, or environmental determinism. To sustain themselves in the marketplace, practitioners of red ocean strategy focus on building advantages over the competition, usually by assessing what competitors do and striving to do it better. Here, grabbing a bigger share of the market is seen as a zero-sum game in which one company's gain is achieved at another company’s loss. Hence, competition, the supply side of the equation, becomes the defining variable of strategy. Here, cost and value are seen as trade-offs and a firm chooses a distinctive cost or differentiation position. Because the total profit level of the industry is also determined by structural factors, firms principally seek to capture and redistribute wealth instead of creating wealth. They focus on dividing up the red ocean, where growth is increasingly limited.

Blue ocean strategy, on the other hand, is based on the view that market boundaries and industry structure are not given and can be reconstructed by the actions and beliefs of industry players. This is what the authors call the reconstructionist view. Assuming that structure and market boundaries exist only in managers’ minds, practitioners who hold this view do not let existing market structures limit their thinking. To them, extra demand is out there, largely untapped. The crux of the problem is how to create it. This, in turn, requires a shift of attention from supply to demand, from a focus on competing to a focus on value innovation – that is, the creation of innovative value to unlock new demand. This is achieved via the simultaneous pursuit of differentiation and low-cost. As market structure is changed by breaking the value/cost tradeoff, so are the rules of the game. Competition in the old game is therefore rendered irrelevant. By expanding the demand side of the economy, new wealth is created. Such a strategy therefore allows firms to largely play a non–zero-sum game, with high payoff possibilities.

History of the concept 
The concept was initially developed in the 1990s when W. Chan Kim was taking part in a consulting project for Philips, headed by the management scholar C.K. Prahalad. Working with consultants from the Mac Group (a consulting company that was later bought by Capgemini), he developed strategy tools leading to the publication of a series of articles in the Harvard Business Review, and then in 2005 of the Blue Ocean Strategy book.

Nintendo's Wii video game console, first released in 2006, has been often considered an example of the blue ocean concept. Instead of trying to compete with the high performance and computational power of the consoles from Sony and Microsoft, Nintendo designed the Wii's hardware to focus on innovative gameplay, incorporating the use of motion controls atypical of video games. These changes brought new gameplay ideas to the system as well as reduced the cost of the console compared to its competitors. As a result, the Wii sold more than 100 million units over its lifetime, far outselling the competitors.

Reception 
Since Blue Ocean Strategy was published in 2005 it has been translated into 43 languages and has sold over 3.5 million copies. The book was named a bestseller by the Wall Street Journal, BusinessWeek, and Amazon.com. It was selected as one of the “Best Books of 2005” by Fast Company magazine, won “The Best Business Book of 2005” Prize at the Frankfurt Book Fair, and achieved bestselling book of the decade status by 800-CEO-READ (2000-2010). Strategy+Business magazine selected it as #1 strategy book of 2005.

In 2009, Blue Ocean Strategy was selected by the China Daily and the China Research Institute as one of the 40 most influential books in the History of the People's Republic of China (1949-2009) along with Adam Smith’s ″The Wealth of Nations″ under the category of ″Economics and Finance.″  In 2010, Polish group ThinkTank selected Blue Ocean Strategy as one of the Top 20 books that have shaped Polish Leaders.  Blue Ocean Strategy won the Thinkers50 2011 Strategy Award for Best Business Book of the decade and in the same year, it was introduced to the Fast Company Leadership Hall of Fame. In 2013, the book received the GoodBooks Award in the Management category by the Vietnamese Institute for Research on Education Development (IRED), was selected as one of the 15 Best Business Books of the last decade in Russia by the Kommersant.ru magazine, and selected as one of the top three best management books in Japan by the Diamond Harvard Business Review.

The Wall Street Journal recommends Blue Ocean Strategy for the top manager. Forbes calls it one of the ten business trends for 2013 and argues that "blue ocean strategies are more influential than ever." BusinessWeek says that "Blue Ocean Strategy will have you wondering why companies need so much persuasion to stay out of shark-infested waters." The Business Strategy Review said the book "challenges everything you knew about strategy", and the Business Times called on firms to "adopt blue ocean strategy to stay ahead."  Marketplace magazine recommends Blue Ocean Strategy as a book "you need to read."  In addition, the book has received many positive reviews from various publications that include Chicago Tribune, Daily Herald, Credit Union Journal, Vancouver Sun, Association Meetings, Strategy & Leadership, and Business First, among many others.

Criticisms 
While Kim and Mauborgne propose approaches to finding uncontested market space, at the present there are few success stories of companies that have actively applied their theories. One success story that does exist is Nintendo, who applied the blue ocean strategy to the Nintendo DS, Wii, and Nintendo Switch.

With just one case study, however, this hole in their data persists despite the publication of value innovation concepts dating back to 1997. Hence, a critical question is whether this book and its related ideas are descriptive rather than prescriptive.  The authors present many examples of successful innovations, and then explain from their Blue Ocean perspective – essentially interpreting success through their lenses.

The research process followed by the authors has been criticized on several grounds. Criticisms include claims that no control group was used, that there is no way to know how many companies using a blue ocean strategy failed and the theory is thus unfalsifiable, that a deductive process was not followed, and that the examples in the book were selected to "tell a winning story". Meanwhile, several attempts at empirical validations and conceptual extensions of the blue ocean strategy have been published.

Additionally, blue ocean strategy cannot be identified as true causation for success. The authors cite the strategies used by NYPD Commissioner Bratton as a key example of Blue Ocean applied in the public sector. They defined this success as a significant drop in crime in the City of New York after Bratton took office in 1994. Many social scientists would disagree that it was Bratton's policies that led to crime reduction: rather, the city was simply part of a nationwide trend in decreasing crime.

Brand and communication are taken for granted and do not represent a key for success. Kim and Maubourgne take the marketing of a value innovation as a given, assuming the marketing success will come as a matter of course.

It is argued that rather than a theory, blue ocean strategy is an extremely successful attempt to brand a set of already existing concepts and frameworks with a highly "sticky" idea. The blue ocean/red ocean analogy is a powerful and memorable metaphor, which is responsible for its popularity. This metaphor can be powerful enough to stimulate people to action. The concepts behind the Blue Ocean Strategy (such as the competing factors, the consumer cycle, non-customers, etc.) are not new, however. Many of these tools are also used by Six Sigma practitioners and proposed by other management theorists.

Many of the book's key concepts were previously covered in Competing For The Future by Gary Hamel and C.K. Prahalad, which was published in 1996. The authors encouraged managers to stake out new marketing space, which they termed white space, in order to "create and dominate emerging opportunities".

See also
 Co-opetition
 Disruptive innovation
 Economics of Strategy
 Thinking Strategically

References

External links 
Blue Ocean Strategy book website

Business books
2004 non-fiction books
2015 non-fiction books
American non-fiction books
Collaborative non-fiction books
Harvard Business Publishing books